The list of shipwrecks in July 1914 includes ships sunk, foundered, grounded, or otherwise lost during July 1914.

1 July

7 July

8 July

10 July

11 July

12 July

13 July

14 July

15 July

18 July

19 July

23 July

27 July

29 July

30 July

31 July

Unknown date

References

1914-07
 07
1914